Makenis is a village in the Vardenis Municipality of the Gegharkunik Province of Armenia.

History 
The Makenyats Vank monastery in the village was a major cultural and educational center of medieval Gegharkunik, with structures dating from the 9th to 13th centuries.

Gallery

References

External links 

 
 

Populated places in Gegharkunik Province